Indian Wars is the name generally used in the United States to describe a series of conflicts between the colonial or federal government and the Native people of North America.

The wars, which ranged from the 17th-century (King Philip's War, King William's War, and Queen Anne's War at the opening of the 18th century) to the Leech Lake uprising in 1898.

The Indian Wars comprised a series of smaller wars. Natives, diverse peoples with their own distinct tribal histories, were no more a single people than the Europeans. Living in societies organized in a variety of ways, Natives usually made decisions about war and peace at the local level, though they sometimes fought as part of formal alliances, such as the Iroquois Confederation, or in temporary confederacies inspired by leaders such as Tecumseh.

Medal of Honor

The Medal of Honor was created during the American Civil War and is the highest military decoration presented by the United States government to a member of its armed forces. Receiving the award did not originally require that the recipient must have distinguished themselves at the risk of their own life above and beyond the call of duty in action against an enemy of the United States; that language was added later.

Due to the nature of this medal, it is commonly presented posthumously.

A

B

C

D

E

F

G

H

I

J

K

L

M

N

O

P

R

S

T

V

W

Y

Z

Notes

References

External links
 themedalofhonor.com Indian Campaigns list

Indian Wars
Wars between the United States and Native Americans
Native American-related lists